Alaidin Sallaku (born 4 February 1995) is an Albanian football player. He plays as a forward for Torpedo Kutaisi in Erovnuli Liga.

In February 2021, Sallaku signed with Torpedo Kutaisi and was presented as a new player of the club.

References

External links
 Profile - FSHF
 Profile - FSHF

1995 births
Living people
Footballers from Tirana
Albanian footballers
Association football forwards
Besa Kavajë players
KF Apolonia Fier players
KS Turbina Cërrik players
Kategoria Superiore players
Kategoria e Parë players